The  César Vallejo University (UCV) is a private Peruvian university located in Victor Larco district in Trujillo city, on the coast of La Libertad Region.

The university was named after the Peruvian poet César Vallejo. It was founded on November 12, 1991 by César Acuña Peralta. Its headquarters are located in Victor Larco district in Trujillo city and has subsidiaries  in Chiclayo, Piura, Chimbote, Tarapoto, and Lima.

Faculties

Faculty of Engineering 
 Industrial Engineering
 Agro Industrial Engineering
 Civil Engineering
 Systems Engineering

Faculty of Human Medicine 
 Human Medicine
 Psychology

Faculty of Communication Studies 
 Communication Studies

Faculty of Health Science 
 Obstetrics

Faculty of Education and Humanities 
 Early childhood education
 Primary education
 Translation and interpreting

Faculty of Economic Sciences 
 Administration
 Accountancy

Faculty of Law and Politic Sciences 
 Law

Faculty of Architecture 
 Architecture

See also 
 Club Deportivo Universidad César Vallejo
 CV Universidad César Vallejo
 Victor Larco Herrera District
 List of universities in Peru
 Trujillo

References 

Universities in Trujillo, Peru
Educational institutions established in 1991
1991 establishments in Peru
César Vallejo University